Abdullah Tahiri (September 2, 1956 – 1999) was an Albanian born in Malishevë, a village located in Gjilan. He was an Albanian leader in the Kosovo Liberation Army.

Education
Tahiri attended primary school until 1975, at which point he left because of "hostile activities" against the state. His secondary education continued in Bujanovac, but he was expelled after helping organize demonstrations in the spring of 1981.

Political activity
Tahiri was one of the organizers of the 1981 protests that took place on March 11, 1981, in Pristina. While many believed the protest to be spontaneous, it was in fact planned and organized by Gani Koci, Bajram Kosumi, and others. On 1–2 April 1981, organized demonstrations began, asking for recognition of a Kosovar Republic. Tahiri organized his fellow citizens around his ideology of freeing Kosovo from Serbian influence.

Tahiri was the OZK (Operative Zone of Karadak) founder of the Kosovo Liberation Army (KLA) and the first commander of OZK Regulation (military force). He became a Major General in the military force and Tahiri had been active in the leadership of the Union of Political Parties of Gjilan that acted as a unique body.

Tahiri was later jailed and sentenced to four years imprisonment.

Death 
Tahiri's body lies in the cemetery of martyrs in Gjilan.

References

External links
  NEWS Kosovapress, 20 MAJ 2010 15: 54, commemorated the first commander of the KLA in the Operative Zone of Karadak
  A.Isufi, Komandant i ZOK-ut të UÇK: A. Tahiri commander of the KLA in the Operative Zone of Karadak, 

1956 births
1999 deaths
Kosovan activists
Kosovo Albanians
Kosovo Liberation Army soldiers
People from Gjilan